Kingdom of Syunik, also known as the Kingdom of Baghk and sometimes as the Kingdom of Kapan, was a medieval dependent Armenian kingdom on the territory of Syunik, Artsakh (present-day Nagorno-Karabakh), and Gegharkunik. Ruled by the Siunia dynasty, the town of Kapan was the capital of the kingdom.

References

1170 disestablishments
States and territories established in the 980s
Bagratid Armenia
Syunik